Joelyn Aimi (born 16 November 1994) is a Papua New Guinean footballer who plays as a defender for Lae FC and the Papua New Guinea women's national team.

Notes

References

1994 births
Living people
Women's association football defenders
Papua New Guinean women's footballers
Papua New Guinea women's international footballers